"It Ain't Me Babe" is a song by Bob Dylan that originally appeared on his fourth album Another Side of Bob Dylan, which was released in 1964 by Columbia Records. According to music critic Oliver Trager, this song, along with others on the album, marked a departure for Dylan as he began to explore the possibilities of language and deeper levels of the human experience. Within a year of its release, the song was picked up as a single by folk rock act the Turtles and country artist Johnny Cash (who sang it as a duet with his future wife June Carter).

Influences
Dylan's biographers generally agree that the song owes its inspiration to his former girlfriend Suze Rotolo. He reportedly began writing the song during his visit to Italy in 1963 while searching for Rotolo, who was studying there.

Clinton Heylin reports that a Times reporter at a May 1964 Royal Festival Hall concert where Dylan first played "It Ain't Me" took the chorus "no, no, no" as a parody of the Beatles' "yeah, yeah, yeah" in "She Loves You".

Nat Hentoff's late October 1964 New Yorker article on Dylan includes an account of Hentoff's presence on the evening in June 1964 in the CBS recording studio when Dylan recorded this and a dozen or so other songs. After some description of the recording studio and booth exchanges among Dylan, his friends, and the session's producers, Hentoff describes the moment. "Dylan," Hentoff writes, "went on to record a song about a man leaving a girl because he was not prepared to be the kind of invincible hero and all-encompassing provider she wanted."  "'It ain't me you're looking for babe,' he [Dylan] sang, with finality," Hentoff writes in his piece.

The melody in both phrases uses a scale descending through a minor third. (Dylan played at the Royal Festival Hall on Sunday, May 17, 1964. The Times reviewed the performance in the following day's edition under the heading of "A Minnesota Minstrel." However, the review makes no mention of "It Ain't Me, Babe.")

Renditions

 Dylan and Johnny Cash were admirers of each other's work. Cash recorded the song with June Carter. The song was released on Cash's 1965 album, Orange Blossom Special, and became a hit. This song was also featured in the 2005 film about Cash's life, Walk the Line, and was performed by Joaquin Phoenix and Reese Witherspoon on the film's soundtrack.
 In 1965, The Turtles also had a breakthrough hit single of the song, which reached #8 in the U.S. and was then featured on their debut album of the same name.
 Jan & Dean covered the song on their 1965 album, Folk 'n Roll.
 "It Ain't Me Babe" was among many Dylan songs recorded by Joan Baez in the early years of her career. Baez's version appeared on her 1964 album Joan Baez/5, which also included "Go 'Way From My Window."  Additionally, Baez's 1967 album Live In Japan contains the song. Dylan and Baez sang a duet of "It Ain't Me Babe" at the Newport Folk Festival on July 24, 1964, as can be seen in the 2007 documentary film The Other Side of the Mirror, and their October 31, 1964 performance of it may be heard on The Bootleg Series Vol. 6: Bob Dylan Live 1964, Concert at Philharmonic Hall, released in 2004.
 Sebastian Cabot recorded a spoken-word variation of the song for his infamous Sebastian Cabot, actor...Bob Dylan, poet album in 1966. This version was included in Golden Throats: The Great Celebrity Sing Off in 1988.
 Nancy Sinatra covered "It Ain't Me Babe" on her 1966 Boots album.
 Flatt & Scruggs covered the song, as well as a number of other Bob Dylan songs on their 1968 album Changin' Times.
 Davy Jones covered the song on his 1965 self-titled debut album David Jones and released it as a single in 1967.
 Johnny Thunders covered the song on his 1983 album Hurt Me.
 Silvertide covered the song in 2006 for the soundtrack for Lady in the Water
 Christofer Drew of Never Shout Never covered the song in 2010 for Billboard'''s website Billboard.com.
 The pop-punk band New Found Glory covered the song on their album From the Screen to Your Stereo Part II.
 Bryan Ferry covered the song on Another Time, Another Place album in 1974
 Kesha covered the song during the 2016 Billboard Music Awards.
 Adam Harvey and Beccy Cole covered the song on their album The Great Country Songbook Volume 2 (2017).
 Soul singer Bettye LaVette included the song on her 2018 Dylan covers album Things Have Changed.
Married Canadian duo Melissa McClelland and Luke Doucet of Whitehorse covered the song on their album The Road to Massey Hall (2013).
 Jesse Cook featuring Melissa McClelland covered the song on his album Frontiers'' (2007).
 Yugoslav rock band Crni Biseri released a Serbo-Croatian cover of the song, entitled "Nisam onaj koga želiš", in 1966.

References

External links
 BobDylan.com lyrics

1964 songs
1965 singles
Songs written by Bob Dylan
Bob Dylan songs
Johnny Cash songs
Joan Baez songs
June Carter Cash songs
Peter, Paul and Mary songs
The Turtles songs
The Byrds songs
Davy Jones songs
Song recordings produced by Tom Wilson (record producer)
Columbia Records singles